Boghal is an arrondissement of Bounkiling in Sédhiou Region in Senegal.

References 

Arrondissements of Senegal